Lisa Jane Miller is a professor, researcher and clinical psychologist, best known as a research scholar on spirituality in psychology.  Dr. Miller is a tenured Full Professor at Columbia University, Teachers College in the Clinical Psychology Program and Founder of the Spirituality Mind Body Institute, a research-based catalytic hub for seeding a more spiritual society. She has collaborated with the US Pentagon, universities, K-12 schools, the arts and private sector business to create a more spiritually aware civil society.
 
Dr. Miller's published science on spirituality in renewal from addiction, depression and struggle has been widely reported in the media including articles focusing on her research in the New York Times and the Wall Street Journal, as well as in television interviews and podcasts.

Early life and early career 
Miller obtained a bachelor's degree Magna Cum Laude with Honors in Psychology from Yale University and a doctorate under Martin Seligman, Ph.D., founder of the positive psychology movement, at the University of Pennsylvania.

Books 
 The Awakened Brain: The New Science of Spirituality and Our Quest for an Inspired Life (2021) 
 The Spiritual Child: The New Science on Parenting for Health and Lifelong Thriving (2015) 
 The Oxford Handbook of Psychology and Spirituality (2012)

See also
 Clinical psychology
 Spirituality

References

Yale University alumni
Teachers College, Columbia University faculty
Psychologists of religion
American women psychologists
20th-century American psychologists
21st-century American psychologists
University of Pennsylvania alumni
Columbia University Vagelos College of Physicians and Surgeons alumni
American women academics
Living people
Year of birth missing (living people)
21st-century American women
American clinical psychologists